Pink Friday is the debut studio album by rapper Nicki Minaj. It was released on November 22, 2010, by Young Money, Cash Money and Universal Motown. After signing a recording contract with Young Money Entertainment in 2009, Minaj began planning the album that same year and work continued into 2010. Minaj enlisted a variety of producers whose efforts resulted in a primarily hip hop and pop record, which sees additional influences from R&B. The album features guest vocals from Eminem, Rihanna, Drake, will.i.am, Kanye West and Natasha Bedingfield.

The album was promoted with eight singles, including the internationally successful single "Super Bass", and US Billboard Hot 100 top 40 singles "Your Love", "Check It Out", "Right Thru Me", "Moment 4 Life", and "Fly". Minaj also supported the album with a five-date promotional concert tour during October 2010. After a much anticipated release, Pink Friday reached number one on the US Billboard 200, selling 375,000 copies in its first week, marking the second highest sales debut for a female rapper since Lauryn Hill, also the highest first week sales for a female debut album of the last decade.

The album received mostly positive critical reviews, however critics were ambivalent on Minaj's exploration of pop. Internationally, it also charted within the top 20 in Australia, Canada, and the United Kingdom.  As of February 2018, the album has sold two million traditional copies in the United States. The album has been certified 3× platinum by the Recording Industry Association of America (RIAA) for combined album sales, track sales, and song streams equivalent of three million album-sale units. Pink Friday was nominated for Best Rap Album at the 54th Grammy Awards in 2012, alongside Minaj's other nominations for Best New Artist and Best Rap Performance for the single "Moment 4 Life".

Recording and production
After a major record label bidding war, Young Money Entertainment announced on August 31, 2009, that Nicki Minaj had signed a 360 deal with the label in which she retains and owns all of her 360 rights – including merchandising, sponsorships, endorsements, touring and publishing. Recording sessions for the album took place at several recording locations, including 25 Sound Studios in Detroit, Chalice Recording Studios in Los Angeles, and Glenwood Place Studios in Burbank, California. Hip-hop producer Swizz Beatz confirmed his collaboration with Minaj for the album, with Minaj discussing a song "Catch Me",  that she described as "moody" and "mellow futuristic" which later became a bonus track on the album. Minaj also confirmed to Entertainment Weekly that the Black Eyed Peas member and record producer will.i.am contributed production to the album. Hip-hop artist and producer Kanye West was also confirmed for the album. Producer Bangladesh also contributed to the album. In 2011, a track entitled "We Miss You" from the album leaked online. Minaj responded saying the song "was sent to Mariah Carey and Keyshia Cole over a year ago" but did not "make Pink Friday due to clearance issues".

Music and lyrics

"Your Love" is a mid-tempo hip-hop, pop, and R&B song, with an auto-tuned chorus. It samples the instrumentals and background vocals of Annie Lennox's cover version of "No More I Love You's" by the Lover Speaks, with the addition of additional bass, drum-loops and hip-hop backbeats. "Roman's Revenge" features American rapper Eminem; the song includes both rappers exchanging bars over a "spastic beat" produced by Swizz Beatz. Lyrically, "Roman's Revenge" has been described as "unrelenting", "bonkers", "angry" and "outrageous". "Did It On'em" is a hardcore hip hop and post-dubstep song that has instrumentally been described as having a massive, ungainly beat. The lyrics speak of Minaj winning over her competition, by saying she "shitted on 'em" or "pissed on 'em."

"Right Thru Me" is styled with pop-rap tones, and has an electronic beat, while being influenced by R&B. Lyrically, the song describes someone who wonders aloud about how a lover can see the real her. Lyrically, "Moment 4 Life", is about a desire to maintain a feeling of accomplishment, as Drake follows behind Minaj and raps the same theme of enjoying the moment. Straying away from the standard rap song construction of three verses and a hook, Nicki performs a brain-dump of sorts on the track, spitting as if she's making a speech to both her fans and detractors. "Check It Out" features the nearly constant repetition of the piano and vocal hook from the Buggles' 1979 classic, "Video Killed the Radio Star", which is famous for being the first video ever played on MTV. "Super Bass" utilizes electronic music and bubblegum pop in its composition, while Minaj raps over a hip hop beat, Minaj explained the song's concept, stating: "'Super Bass' is about the boy that you are crushing over, [...] And you kind of want to get your mack on, but you're taking the playful approach."

Singles

"Massive Attack" was released on April 13, 2010, through digital distribution. The song was a distinct change from Minaj's previous work on mixtapes and features, thus receiving mixed to positive reviews from critics, commending lyrical content and distinctiveness, but critiquing that it did not fit her "Barbie" persona well. The song bubbled under the US Billboard Hot 100 at number 22, and peaked at number 65 on the Hot R&B/Hip-Hop Songs chart. "Massive Attack" was initially announced as the album's lead single, however, after the single's poor chart performance, it was pulled from the album.

"Your Love" was released as the album's first official US single on June 1, 2010, and as the first single in the United Kingdom on July 2, 2010. Initially, the song had never been planned for release, but due to abounding airplay it was mastered and used as the follow-up to "Massive Attack". The song peaked at number 14 on the Billboard Hot 100, number four on the Hot R&B/Hip-Hop Songs chart and topped the Hot Rap Songs chart for eight consecutive weeks. Minaj became the first female artist to top the Hot Rap Songs chart unaccompanied since 2002. It also charted in Canada and the UK.

"Check It Out" was released on September 3, 2010. It was a joint single from the album between will.i.am and Minaj. A music video for the song was directed by Rich Lee and was released on October 25, 2010. The song has since peaked at number 24 on the Billboard Hot 100. "Right Thru Me" was released on September 24, 2010. A music video directed by Diane Martel was released for the single on October 27, 2010. The song peaked at number 26 on the Billboard Hot 100.

"Moment 4 Life", which features Drake, was released on December 7, 2010, as the album's fourth single. The music video for "Moment 4 Life" was released on January 27, 2011. The song peaked at number 13 on the Billboard Hot 100 and topped both the Hot R&B/Hip-Hop Songs and Rap Songs charts. "Roman's Revenge" featuring Eminem was released as a promotional single to iTunes on October 30, 2010.

"Super Bass" was released as the album's fifth single and officially impacted radio on April 5, 2011. It was released to iTunes in some markets on May 13, 2011. The song became an international top ten hit. In its seventh week on the Billboard Hot 100, the song had peaked at number 3, making it Minaj's first top ten placement as a lead artist.

"Did It On'em" was sent to Urban radio on April 7, 2011, as the album's sixth single. The song peaked at number 49 on the Billboard Hot 100 and at numbers 3 and 4 on the Hot R&B/Hip-Hop Songs and Rap Songs charts respectively. "Girls Fall Like Dominoes" was released in Australia on April 11, 2011, and in the United Kingdom on April 15, 2011.

"Fly", which features Rihanna, was the album's eighth and final single. It was sent to US rhythmic radio and to Top 40/Mainstream radio on August 30, 2011. The song peaked at number 19 on the Billboard Hot 100 as well as in the top 20 in Australia and the United Kingdom.

Release and promotion
On July 8, 2010, Minaj announced via Twitter that the album would be released on November 23, 2010. It was later announced that the album was pushed up by one day to November 22, 2010. Minaj's official website and related social networking outlets later announced that the digital download version of the album would be available for pre-order through iTunes on October 30, less than a month before the release date of the physical edition.

On her Twitter, Minaj stated that if she reached one million followers she would dedicate a Ustream to her fans. On August 3, 2010, Minaj went on Ustream to call fans who emailed her their phone numbers and to reveal the album's title. Later that same day, Minaj revealed on Ustream that the album's name would be Pink Friday, stating, "To carry on a great tradition of Black Friday, we are going to switch it up this year in honor of the Nicki Minaj album and call that day Pink Friday, and call my album Pink Friday!" A deluxe edition of the album was also confirmed. Minaj released the official artwork for her album cover on Friday, October 15, 2010. Rap-Up commented on the album cover, stating "The cover features Minaj as a doll alarmingly staring at the camera, sitting armless on the ground with her elongated legs in a flowing silver corset, pink stilettos, and a stark pink wig." GL Woods, the photographer of the cover, stated that Minaj wanted to look like a "broken Barbie". Woods photographed Minaj for an Out, which had a similar theme; according to the photographer, Minaj was inspired by the photoshoot.

Prior to the release of Pink Friday, MAC Cosmetics announced and launched a lipstick called "Pink 4 Friday" that was sold for four consecutive Fridays beginning November 26, 2010, in promotion of the album. In 2011, OPI Products created a six-piece nail polish collection with Minaj, in which the colors of the collection were named after select songs from the album. In December 2011, Mattel produced a custom-made, Minaj-themed Barbie doll valued at about $15,000 for auction. The doll's design was modeled after Minaj as how she appears on the Pink Friday album cover, with the pink wig and a similar outfit.

A 2020 reissue of the album, titled "Complete Edition", was released to coincide with its 10th anniversary on November 20, 2020, containing  all the bonus tracks that were released from other versions of the album, such as "Bedrock", and the Lil Wayne remix of "Roman's Revenge".

Tour

Minaj announced via the social networking site Twitter that she would kick off a five-date promotional tour a month before the album dropped. Tweeting, "Ok Barbz, here are the 1st 5 dates on my Pink Friday Tour," the tour began in Philadelphia on October 22, and ran through October 30 in Trinidad and Tobago.

Critical reception

Pink Friday was met with mostly positive critical reviews. At Metacritic, which assigns a normalized rating out of 100 to reviews from mainstream publications, the album received an average score of 68, based on 26 reviews.

Reviewing the album for The Boston Globe, James Reed called it "a brash pop album brimming with Minaj's various personae and Technicolor rhymes". Entertainment Weeklys Brad Wete applauded Minaj's "knack for melody" and "boasting lyrics", while Sam Wolfson of NME noted Minaj's "pop sensibility", "volatility and quirks ... reminiscent of heyday Lil Wayne". Los Angeles Times writer Margaret Wappler commented that the album "shows Minaj is on the cusp", while Ann Powers noted Minaj's attempt to showcase her multi-faceted range and complimented her female perspective. Marc Hogan of Spin said it succeeded more as "a budding artist's love letter to pop – well-wrought and exuberantly penned", while Pitchfork critic Scott Plagenhoef believed "even when she's aiming down the middle of the road, she's at least better than almost anyone else", while citing the hip-hop bonus tracks "Blow Ya Mind" and "Muny" as among the album's best. He stated that the "pop album" is "a depressing Nicki Minaj album." AllMusic's David Jeffries wrote that the album "both dazzles and disappoints", stating "Feed off the production, the great musical ideas, and Minaj's keen sense of her surroundings, and Pink Friday is an outstanding success". Allison Stewart of The Washington Post wrote that the album "nibbles at the edges of what female rappers are allowed to do, even as it provides a steady helping of pop hits". Robert Christgau from MSN Music called Minaj "the quick-lipped hoyden of the year" who is "proud to be shameless, with the hooks to back it up", and later named Pink Friday the 12th best album of 2010.

Some reviewers were more critical. Andy Gill of The Independent felt that "Right Thru Me" is the only track that exhibits "adequate use of [Minaj's] R&B vocal skills" among an album of unoriginal "rap braggadocio". Slant Magazines Jesse Cataldo praised Minaj's versatility on tracks like "Roman's Revenge", but was disappointed with the collaborative "Moment 4 Life", noting she could have shown more confidence by acting as a foil for Drake, but didn't. In The Observer, Kitty Empire called the album a "triumph of prevarication", but observed a stylistic identity crisis, with a satisfactory but characterless portion of pop music. Rich Juzwiak of The Village Voice criticized the album's "R&B crossover" material and found it lyrically "underwhelming". Alexis Petridis of The Guardian commented that "for every burst of originality, there's a burst of generic frosty synth and Auto-Tune", noting that "the pop- and R&B-influenced tracks simply aren't as exciting, lyrically or musically, as the foam-mouthed hardcore ones".

Accolades

Commercial performance
Pink Friday debuted at number two on the US Billboard 200 chart, selling 375,000 copies in its first week. This marked the second-highest sales week for a female hip hop recording artist, behind Lauryn Hill's The Miseducation of Lauryn Hill in 1998. On December 17, 2010, the album was certified platinum by the Recording Industry Association of America (RIAA). In its eleventh week on the chart, the album sold 45,000 copies and topped the Billboard 200. The album also held the record for the most weeks in the top ten on the Billboard 200 chart by a female rap album, having spent fourteen consecutive weeks in the top ten since its release. On March 22, 2016, the album was certified triple platinum by the RIAA for combined album sales, track sales, on-demand audio, and video streams equivalent of three million album-sale units. As of February 2018, the album has sold two million traditional copies in the United States.

Internationally, Pink Friday peaked at number eight in Canada, and within the top twenty in Australia, Ireland and the United Kingdom. In the United Kingdom, it has sold 282,000 copies, as of April 2012.

Legacy 
According to DeMicia Inman of Nylon, Pink Fridays commercial success "propelled [Minaj] into worldwide fame, which comes with more weight and responsibility than handing out mixtapes and street DVDs in club parking lots" and also "expanded the constraints that previously contained women to battle it out for a metaphorical throne". Dayna Haffenden of Complex wrote that "throughout the 13-song tracklist, she proved her pen game was not to be questioned, while showcasing her vulnerability and chameleonic abilities". Nick Soulsby of PopMatters wrote that "we're witnessing an avalanche of female rappers rising to the top" and that "we're living in a house that Minaj built and recognition that she is the finest rapper of the past decade... is overdue". Billboard credited Pink Friday with helping Minaj reintroduce female rap into the mainstream in the United States. Writing in 2021, Ellish Gilligan of Junkee wrote that "the influence of Pink Friday in pop, rap and even hyperpop in undeniable" and added that is still inspiring albums like Doja Cat's Planet Her (2021).

Track listing
Credits adapted from the liner notes of Pink Friday.

Sample credits
"Check It Out" samples "Video Killed the Radio Star" performed by The Buggles, and elements and samples of "Think (About It)" written by James Brown, performed by Lyn Collins.
"Blazin" samples "Don't You (Forget About Me)", written by Keith Forsey and Steve Schiff, as performed by Simple Minds.
"Here I Am" samples "Red Sky" by John B and Shaz Sparks.
"Your Love" samples "No More I Love You's" by Annie Lennox.
"Girls Fall Like Dominoes" contains samples from "Dominos" written by The Big Pink, and interpolations of "Trailar Load a Girls" written by Cleveland Browne, Greville Gordon and Whycliffe Johnson.

Personnel
Credits adapted from AllMusic.

Chris Bellman – mastering
Joshua Berkman – A&R
Sandy Brummels – art direction
Noel Cadastre – assistant
Dwayne "Tha President" Carter – executive producer
Lyttleton "Cartwheel" Carter – assistant
Ariel Chobaz – engineer, mixing
Seandrae "Mr. Bangladesh" Crawford – producer
James Cruz – A&R, management
Sean Combs – management
DJ Ammo – synthesizer
Dylan Dresdow – mixing
Chris Gehringer – mastering
Kevin Hissink – electric guitar
John B. – keyboards, producer, programming
Padraic Kerin – engineer
Kidus Henok – A&R
Kenny Meiselas – legal counsel
Drew Money – producer
Charles Moniz – engineer
J.R. Rotem – arranger, mixing
Safaree "SB" Samuels – A&R, vocals
Ed Shapiro – legal counsel
Noah "40" Shebib – engineer
Olivia Smith – package design
Shaz Sparks – vocals
Swizz Beatz – producer
T-Minus – producer
Pop Wansel – producer
will.i.am – drum programming, engineer, producer, synthesizer
Bryan Williams – executive producer
Ronald Williams – executive producer
G.L. Wood – photography

Charts

Weekly charts

Year-end charts

Decade-end charts

Certifications

See also
List of Billboard 200 number-one albums of 2011

References

External links
 

2010 debut albums
Albums produced by Bangladesh (record producer)
Albums produced by J. R. Rotem
Albums produced by Kane Beatz
Albums produced by Swizz Beatz
Albums produced by T-Minus (record producer)
Albums produced by will.i.am
Cash Money Records albums
Nicki Minaj albums
Universal Motown Records albums
Young Money Entertainment albums
Albums produced by Oak Felder